The packet erasure channel is a communication channel model where sequential packets are either received or lost (at a known location).  This channel model is closely related to the binary erasure channel.

An erasure code can be used for forward error correction on such a channel.

See also
Network traffic simulation
Traffic generation model

References

 Philip A. Chou, Mihaela van der Schaar: Multimedia over IP and wireless networks, 

Coding theory